St Clears A.F.C. are a Welsh football club from the town of St Clears, Carmarthenshire in the southwest of Wales. They currently play in the Pembrokeshire League Division One.

History

The present club was reformed in 1965 and entered the Pembrokeshire League. They won the third division championship in their first season before winning the second division in their second season. They followed this up with a third back-to-back championship in 1967–68 becoming Division One champions for the first, and only time to date.

Honours

 Pembrokeshire League Division One  - Champions (1) 1967–68
 Pembrokeshire League Division One  - Runners-Up (1): 1981–82 
 Pembrokeshire League Division Two  - Champions (2) 1966–67; 1979–80
 Pembrokeshire League Division Two  - Runners-Up (5): 1989–90; 1997–98; 2000–01; 2012–13; 2017–18, 2021–22
 Pembrokeshire League Division Three  - Champions (5): 1965–66; 1967–68 (second team); 1987–88; 1995–96; 2011–12
 Pembrokeshire League Division Three - Runners-Up (1): 2008–09
 Pembrokeshire League Division Four - Runners-Up (1): 1978–79 (second team)
 Pembrokeshire League Reserves Division Two - Runners-Up (1): 1995–96
 Mond Cup - Winners: 2013–14

References

External links
Official club Facebook
Official club Twitter

Football clubs in Wales
Sport in Pembrokeshire
Pembrokeshire League clubs
Association football clubs established in 1965
1965 establishments in Wales
St Clears